UK arms export refers to trades of UK-made weapons around the world. The country is one of the world’s most successful arms exporters. According to the analysis by Action on Armed Violence, Military arms deals have been prepared £39bn between 2008 and 2017.

According to the Campaign Against Arms Trade (CATT), the UK mostly has exported arms to United States, India, France, Germany, Italy, Oman, South Africa, Turkey, South Korea, Israel, the United Arab Emirates and Saudi Arabia.

History
UK Trade and investment reveals that "The UK is one of the world's most successful defence exporters, averaging second place in the global rankings on a rolling ten-year basis, making it Europe's leading defence exporter in the period". Also, the UK is known as the most robust export control government in the world. Every application is considered on a case-by-case basis against the Consolidated EU and National Arms Export Licensing Criteria. It is proctored, as reported by a spokesman for the Department for International Trade.

According to the analysis by Action on Armed Violence, military arms deals have been prepared £39bn between 2008 and 2017, £12bn of which belongs to states included on the Foreign and Commonwealth Office human rights “priority countries” list. The analysis of the figures, collated by the Campaign Against the Arms Trade using export control data from the Department for International Trade is indicating a growing trend.
As CAAT mentioned, It is probable to be “conservative estimate” because of an opaque system of “open” licenses that allow an unlimited number for exporting, but less scrutiny of “open” licenses has been denied by the DIT. In 2016, 5,782 export licenses for military items in countries of concern which provide £1.5bn was reported.

British sales worldwide

The Audit of the Government’s Annual Report on Strategic Export Controls reported that the UK-made arms were exported to 159 countries in 2000.
Since 2010, British arms have been transferred to 51 countries, 22 of which were mentioned on the UK Government's own human rights watch list. Most were located in Middle Eastern countries where terror threats have been increasing steadily.

In 2016 most of arms exports went to 18 countries including China, Saudi Arabia, Bahrain, Israel, Egypt, and Pakistan. In 2017 Israel was the second-biggest buyer of UK arms which was appointed on the Foreign and Commonwealth Office's (FCO) human rights priority list. Also, Bahrain paid £30.7m for UK arms, Egypt bought £6.5m of arms, Pakistan purchased £11.2m and £11.8m was paid by China. The Bangladeshi government, which had taken more than 688,000 Rohingya refugees from Myanmar following ethnic cleansing and religious persecution there, bought £38.6m of arms. The UK's main arms deals go to the United States, India, France, Germany, Italy, Israel, Oman, South Africa, Turkey, South Korea, the United Arab Emirates and Saudi Arabia, respectively.

The arms manufactured in the UK includes bombs, missiles, and fighter jets, machine guns. The shelf-life of weapons is often longer than the governments and situations they were sold to.

2021 analysis by the CAAT revealed that the British government financed more than £17 billion worth of weapons to nearly 70% of the world's worst human rights abusers, such as Egypt, Bahrain, Qatar, Saudi Arabia, Thailand and Turkey.

An analysis by the Scottish Greens discovered that the UK government licensed £2.8 billion worth of arms to human rights abusers, including Saudi Arabia, UAE, Egypt and Turkey, since Boris Johnson became the Prime Minister in July 2019. The analysis found that the largest buyer of UK arms was Saudi Arabia, which accounted for £1.7 billion worth of the value of arms license. On the other hand, the UAE bought £347 million worth of arms. Since 2015, both the countries have been waging a war on Yemen, using UK-made fighter jets, bombs and missiles.

Arms control
As the Campaign Against Arms Trade (CAAT)'s Andrew Smith told, Theresa May’s government is strongly supporting some countries that even it believes are accountable for human rights abuses. There are no controls over how these arms will be used when they have been sold by the UK. The arms sales being agreed today could be used to fuel atrocities for years to come. Human rights abuses are observed by UK-made fighter jets and bombs in the Saudi-led destruction of Yemen. He added, This kind of Arm trade not only leads to “human rights abusers with the means to kill” but also it provides the position of political support. In 2016, most of the UK arm was exported to countries listed as human rights abusers. While the UK rules confirms that this government doesn’t deal with countries accused of violent human rights, in the last 4 years almost half of UK arms have been transferred to Saudi Arabia including sky-rocketed, based on UK government statistics significantly reported.

As The Guardian reported, "Britain is Saudi Arabia's second largest arms dealer after the US, providing military exports worth £10.3bn over the past decade despite continued condemnation of the kingdom's use of British weaponry in its bombing of Yemen". In other words, Saudi Arabia has been mentioned as Britain’s largest arms customer.

In April 2020, analysis figures by the CAAT revealed that the UK in 2019 sold arms worth £1.3bn to 26 out of 48 nations classified as “not free” by Freedom House. The data also stated that the sale of weaponry increased by 300 per cent as compared to 2018.

In June 2020, the UK government came under criticism for export of CS gas, teargas and rubber bullets to the USA, which were being used against Black Lives Matter protesters.

On 8 July 2020, the Conservative Party sparked anger by revealing that they would resume weapons sales to Saudi Arabia, after a government report found there had been no "pattern" of Saudi air strikes that breached international law. Shadow Secretary of State for International Trade Emily Thornberry called this action "morally indefensible".
In January 2023, the Campaign Against Arms Trade (CAAT) brought a judicial review in the high court over the decision made by the Conservative Party in 2020 to resume arms sales to Saudi Arabia. The campaigners arguing  that Liz Truss, the then-trade minister, ignored the breaches of humanitarian law by the Saudi Arabian government in Yemen.

The UK has exported £11bn worth of arms in 2019 according to the Department for International Trade (DIT)'s data. The sale was made despite June 2019 UK court ruling halting arms sales to Saudi Arabia due to its use in Yemen war contributing to the ongoing humanitarian crisis.

On 27 October 2020, the CAAT launched a judicial review application into the UK’s decision to renew selling arms to Saudi Arabia, despite a United Nations report citing serious international humanitarian law violations. The UK licensed the sale of at least £4.7 billion worth of arms to Saudi Arabia, since the beginning of the civil war in Yemen, but the real figure was expected to be higher as claimed by the CAAT.

The legal challenge faced by the UK government over its decision to grant export licenses for selling arms to Saudi led to a revelation of a confidential log maintaining the alleged breaches of the international humanitarian law (IHL). It was reported that the database retained by the UK Ministry of Defense since 2015 didn’t include a series of airstrikes by Saudi-led forces in breach of IHL, which were recorded by the human rights organizations and NGOs in Yemen. However, the government said that the information details were sensitive to make public.

According to CAAT analysis, the UK government has allowed arms sale to repressive regimes like Saudi Arabia and Egypt, via a secretive and opaque licensing. Under the open licence mechanism, tracking arms sales has been relatively difficult. Based on the export licence figures and military contracts issued from 2010 to 2019, the UK government sold approximately £44bn of the total £86.1bn weapons through open licences.

See also
Arms industry
Arms control

References

Arms control
Organisations based in the London Borough of Islington
Peace organisations based in the United Kingdom